Events from the year 1850 in Ireland.

Events
 Ongoing – Great Famine subsides.
 31 March – the paddle steamer , bound from Cork to London, sinks in the English Channel with the loss of all 250 on board.
 October – Central Criminal Lunatic Asylum for Ireland opened in Dundrum, Dublin, the first secure hospital in Europe.
 19 November – the barque Edmond sinks off Kilkee with the loss of 98 of the 216 aboard.
 Improved navigation of River Shannon throughout from Killaloe to Lough Key is completed.
 The Encumbered Estates Commissioners sell off remaining Donegall estate properties in Belfast to the tenants.
 Crumlin Road Courthouse in Belfast is completed.

Arts and literature
Brian Mac Giolla Meidhre's poem Cúirt An Mheán Oíche is first published from the oral tradition in an edition by the scholar John O'Daly.
Tara Brooch (c.700 AD) found  near Laytown, County Meath.

Sport
27 February – Abd El Kader wins the Aintree Grand National in England, having been trained at Dardistown Castle by his owner, Joe Osborne.

Births
10 January – William Reid Clanny, physician and inventor of the Clanny safety lamp for miners (born 1770).
6 August – Windham Quin, 2nd Earl of Dunraven and Mount-Earl, peer (born 1782).
13 August – Martin Archer Shee, painter (born 1769).
18 August – Charles Arbuthnot, Tory politician and member of the Privy Council (born 1767).
10 October – Jon Riley, deserter from United States Army, a founder of the San Patricios (born 1805).
29 December – William Hamilton Maxwell, novelist (born 1792).

Deaths
25 April – William Melville, police officer and first chief of the British Secret Service (died 1918).
9 June – Pierce Charles de Lacy O'Mahony, Nationalist politician, barrister and philanthropist (died 1930).
24 June – Herbert Kitchener, 1st Earl Kitchener, British Field Marshal and statesman (drowned 1916).
17 July – Edmond Holmes, educationalist, writer on religion and poet (died 1936).
12 September – James Bernard, 4th Earl of Bandon, Deputy Lieutenant in Ireland (died 1924).
8 October – Matthias McDonnell Bodkin, Nationalist politician, barrister and journalist (died 1933).
22 December – Thomas O'Shaughnessy, lawyer and judge (died 1933).
Full date unknown
Thomas Lough, Liberal politician in Britain, Lord Lieutenant of Cavan (died 1922).
Samuel Shumack, farmer and author in Australia (died 1940 in Australia).

References

 
1850s in Ireland
Ireland
Years of the 19th century in Ireland
 Ireland